Elliott Wright is a British reality television personality.

He appeared in The Only Way is Essex between 2010 and 2017. He was the main person in the six part series Playa in Marbella and Get Your Act Together, where he was trained by Billy George. Elliott is the cousin of Mark, Josh and Jess Wright.

In 2016, he became engaged to Sadie Stuart he is now married to Sadie Stuart Wright. He lives in Bromley:Chislehurst, England.

References

Year of birth missing (living people)
Living people
People from Marbella